Peter Frank may refer to:

 Peter Frank (academic) (1934–2013), British academic and Russia specialist
 Peter Frank (art critic) (born 1950), American art critic
 Peter Frank (footballer) (born 1970), former Danish footballer
 Peter Frank (jurist) (born 1968), German Public Prosecutor General
 Peter Frank (actor) (1920–1984), actor in The Terrible People (1960 film) and other films

See also
 Pete Frank (1930–2005), NASA flight director